Bruce Meredith (born April 19, 1937 in Wheeling, West Virginia) is a sport shooter who competes for the U.S. Virgin Islands in international competition. He competed in rifle shooting events at the Summer Olympics in 1988, 1992, 1996, and 2000. He was the oldest athlete to compete at the 2000 Summer Olympics. He won the silver medal in the 50 metre rifle prone competition at the 1995 Pan American Games.

Olympic results

References

1937 births
Living people
Sportspeople from Wheeling, West Virginia
ISSF rifle shooters
United States Virgin Islands male sport shooters
Shooters at the 1988 Summer Olympics
Shooters at the 1992 Summer Olympics
Shooters at the 1996 Summer Olympics
Shooters at the 2000 Summer Olympics
Olympic shooters of the United States Virgin Islands
Shooters at the 1995 Pan American Games
Shooters at the 1999 Pan American Games
Shooters at the 2003 Pan American Games
Shooters at the 2007 Pan American Games
Pan American Games silver medalists for the United States Virgin Islands
Pan American Games medalists in shooting
Shooters at the 1967 Pan American Games
Medalists at the 1995 Pan American Games